Vinica Municipality may refer to:
 Vinica Municipality, North Macedonia
 Vinica, Varaždin County, Croatia
 Vinica, Veľký Krtíš District, Slovakia

Municipality name disambiguation pages